6009 Aluminium alloy has minor elements as silicon, iron, magnesium, zinc, manganese, copper, chromium, and titanium.

Chemical Composition

Mechanical Properties

Thermal properties

Applications 
 Body-panel
 Body-structure and parts

References 

Aluminium–magnesium–silicon alloys